Crisostomo Arameo, O.S.B. (died 1605) was a Roman Catholic prelate who served as Bishop of Ston (1585–1605).

Biography
Crisostomo Arameo was ordained a priest in the Order of Saint Benedict. On 18 March 1585, he was appointed by Pope Gregory XIII as Bishop of Ston. He served as Bishop of Ston until his death in 1605.

References 

1605 deaths
16th-century Roman Catholic bishops in Croatia
17th-century Roman Catholic bishops in Croatia
Bishops appointed by Pope Gregory XIII
Benedictine bishops